Kakwa Wildland Park is a provincial park in the Rocky Mountain Foothills just east of the northern Canadian Rockies, in Alberta, Canada, immediately east of the border with British Columbia at the 120th meridian west. The park is home to Alberta's tallest waterfall, the Kakwa Falls, which is 30 metres tall.

It adjoins Willmore Wilderness Park and British Columbia's Kakwa Provincial Park and Protected Area and together with them comprises the first interprovincial park shared between BC and Alberta.

It takes the name from Kakwa, the Cree word for porcupine.

See also
List of Alberta provincial parks
Cypress Hills Interprovincial Park (Alberta-Saskatchewan)

References

Municipal District of Greenview No. 16
Parks in Alberta
Parks in the Canadian Rockies
Protected areas established in 1996
1996 establishments in Alberta